The International Science Council (ISC) is an international non-governmental organization that unites scientific bodies at various levels across the social and natural sciences. The ISC was formed with its inaugural general assembly on 4 July 2018 by the merger of the former International Council for Science and the International Social Science Council (ISSC), making it one of the largest organisations of this type. 

Daya Reddy, mathematician, served as the ISC's inaugural President from 2018-2021. Sir Peter Gluckman, pediatrician, biomedical scientist, and science-policy expert, was elected President in October 2021. Other ISC's inaugural Officers elected for the term of 2018–2021 were Elisa Reis (Vice President), Jinghai Li (Vice President), Renée van Kessel (Treasurer), and Alik Ismail-Zadeh (Secretary). Until February 2022, Heide Hackmann served as the Council's CEO.

Activities
The Council convenes and mobilizes the international scientific community on issues of major scientific and public importance. Activities focus on three areas of work: 

 Stimulating and supporting international scientific research and scholarship, and communicating science that is relevant to international policy issues; 
 Promoting the ability of science to contribute to major issues; 
 Defending the free and responsible practice of science.

The Council is involved in co-sponsorship of a number of international research programmes, networks and committees.

The Council awards the Stein Rokkan Prize for Comparative Social Science Research.

The Council's present activities are guided by the Action Plan 2022-2024: Science and Society in Transition. At the heart of the Action Plan is a selection of projects and programmes that are relevant to all scientific fields and all parts of the world.

Structure 
The Council is governed by its Governing Board and is advised by a number of advisory bodies in thematic areas such as space, polar, climatic, and data research. It is headquartered in Paris with a regional office in Colombia. The Officers of the Governing Board are currently 
Peter Gluckman (President),
Motoko Kotani (President-elect),
Anne Husebekk (Vice-President for Freedom and Responsibility in Science),
Salim Abdool Karim (Vice-President for Outreach and Engagement), and
Sawako Shirahase (Vice-President for Finance of the Council).

The ISC's next assembly is scheduled for 2024.

Members 
In 2020, the International Science Council has 135 member organizations, 40 member unions and associations, and 30 affiliated members.

Member unions and associations

National members

Transnational members 
 Arab Council for the Social Sciences (ACSS)
 Association of Asian Social Science Research Councils (AASSREC)
 Caribbean Academy of Sciences
 Consejo Latinoamericano de Ciencias Sociales (CLACSO)
 Council for the Development of Social Science Research in Africa (CODESRIA)
 Latin American Faculty of Social Sciences (FLACSO)
 Union Académique Internationale (UAI)
 Organization for Social Science Research in Eastern and Southern Africa (OSSREA)
 University of the South Pacific

Affiliated members 
 Academy of Social Sciences (ACSS)
 African Academy of Sciences (AAS)
 Association of Academies and Societies of Sciences in Asia (AASSA)
 Association of Science-Technology Centers (ASTC)
 European Association of Development and Training Institutes (EADI)
 European Consortium for Political Research (ECPR)
 Fédération Internationale des Géomètres (FIG)
 Global Young Academy (GYA)
 International Arctic Science Committee (IASC)
 International Association for Hydro-Environment Engineering and Research (IAHR)
 International Association of Applied Psychology (IAAP)
 International Commission for Acoustics (ICA)
 International Commission for Optics (ICO)
 International Commission on Illumination (CIE)
 International Council for Industrial and Applied Mathematics (ICIAM)
 International Council for Laboratory Animal Science (ICLAS)
 International Council for Scientific and Technical Information (ICSTI)
 International Federation for Information Processing (IFIP)
 International Federation of Data Organizations for Social Science (IFDO)
 International Federation of Library Associations and Institutions (IFLA)
 International Foundation for Science (IFS)
 International Institute for Applied Systems Analysis (IIASA)
 International Society for Digital Earth (ISDE)
 International Society for Porous Media (InterPore)
 International Studies Association (ISA)
 International Union for Vacuum Science, Technique and Applications (IUVSTA)
 International Union of Speleology (UIS)
 International Water Association (IWA)
 Pacific Science Association (PSA)
 Scientific Committee on Problems of the Environment (SCOPE)
 Social Science Research Council (SSRC)
 The World Academy of Sciences (TWAS)
 Transnational Institute (TNI)

GeoUnions 
A subset of ISC dealing with Earth and space sciences forms the GeoUnions network:
International Astronomical Union
International Cartographic Association
International Geographical Union
International Union of Quaternary Research
International Society for Photogrammetry and Remote Sensing
International Union of Geodesy and Geophysics
International Union of Geological Sciences
International Union of Soil Sciences
International Union of Radio Sciences
The ISC GeoUnions partially overlap with the UN-GGIM Geospatial Societies.

References

External links

International organizations based in France
 
Organizations based in Paris
Scientific organizations based in France
Scientific organizations established in 2018